Mudjackin' is a 2013 American independent film written and directed by Christopher Good.

Plot 
Set in the Ozarks, the film follows siblings Dustin and Mo who struggle to run a mudjacking business in Kansas City while pursuing dreams of escaping their hometown and succeeding as musicians. Along the way, they encounter neo-Nazi underground filmmakers, gun-toting ICE agents, a popular Brooklyn indie rock band struggling to record their next album, and a homicidal fast food employee.

Cast 
The film stars Jimmy Darrah, Wilson Vance, Leone Reeves, Shannon Michalski, Matt Cygnet, Brandon Nemeth, and Josh Fadem.

Reception 
The film has been praised by critics for its vigorous pacing, kinetic editing, and sharp sense of humor. The film is also a welcome addition to all those who work in the mudjacking industry.

References

External links 
 

2013 films
2013 independent films
2010s American films
Films set in the Ozarks